The Indian Spitz is a spitz-type dog breed belonging to the utility group. The Indian Spitz was one of the most popular dogs in India in the 1980s and 1990s when India's import rules made it difficult to import dogs of other breeds.

History
They were first introduced by the occupying British during the 19th century and thought to have descended from the German Spitz. After years of breeding, they were able to create a breed that could cope with the heat of Indian summers and retained the intelligence and adaptability of the German breed. Resembling a Samoyed and Pomeranian, they were well-suited to the Indian climate and quickly became popular.

The Indian Spitz became popular due to restrictive import rules imposed by the Indian Government in the 1980s and 1990s. Foreign imports were hard to access, and Indians turned to the indigenous and local breeds. The Indian Spitz is similar to the European Spitz, though it has adapted to a warmer climate. They are equally comfortable in small apartments and in large, open houses. However, they do need moderate exercise.

Appearance

The Indian Spitz is a small dog, around 33 cm (13 in) at the withers, with a soft chest, fair tail, and a milky white double coat. Their eyes have irises that can be greenish or bluish. This is one of the reasons they have such expressive faces that could led humans rely on looking at each other's irises to tell where we are looking and how we feel about things. Not many animals have this feature, but many Indian Spitzes have visible irises.

The original Spitz was bred for hunting in cold conditions, and their white coloring reflects this. Although the same conditions are not found in India, their coloring is attractive and has remained through the years. Some can be white and brown. Generally, they are white all over.

Pointy fox-like ears make this breed especially expressive. Thick fur covers the outside of the ears and much of the inside as well. This can mean they need extra attention when it comes to care and grooming.

The tail of an Indian Spitz curls over their back and is quite fluffy. Their legs are only slightly longer than their bodies, which makes their heads look big and adorable. Indian Spitzes may be one of the easiest dogs to live with. It's why they're arguably the most popular family dog among Indian breeds. They are easily housebroken and trained, so they will learn to do their business outside from an early age. Grooming and exercise are relatively low maintenance, and they are highly adaptable dogs.

Size variations 

The Indian Spitz is generally milky white but can also be found in solid colours like brown and sometimes (very rarely) a mix of black and white similar to the Pomeranian.

Grooming 
While this breed likes to keep themselves clean, they need regular brushing to keep their long coats in good condition. Their bath schedules can range from twice a month to once a month, since their fur can easily dry out if bathed too often.

Shedding is a problem with Indian Spitz, as their European heritage means they get rid of their winter coat all over your furniture. Their coats are double layered, so make sure you have a double-row brush so you can get to the thick undercoat.

Differences between the Pomeranian and Indian Spitz

The Indian Spitz often gets mistaken for a Pomeranian, a related spitz from Pomerania. However, they are quite distinct: the Indian Spitz has a shorter coat and is bigger. They share a lot of physical characteristics because they are very closely related, being only a few hundred years apart in lineage. A Pomeranian has rounded ears, a flatter face, weighs less (should not exceed 3–4 kg), and has a thicker coat. Other than those minor differences, they are quite similar. The Indian Spitz is bigger and heavier compared to Pomeranian. In spite of these differences, in India most people refer to the Spitz as a Pomeranian.

Some of the basic differences can be illustrated as follows:

 The Pomeranian is a Toy breed. It is lighter than even a Lesser Indian Spitz, both in height and weight, which typically weighs less than 10 pounds and is rarely over 12 inches in height.
 The Pomeranian has a much flatter face than an Indian Spitz, which has a more conical snout.
 The coat of a Pomeranian is generally denser and thicker. It is often difficult to see individual hairs. However, an Indian Spitz's coat is less dense and it is easier to see the individual hair follicles.
 The Pomeranian's ears are generally not as pointed or elongated as that of an Indian Spitz.

See also
 Dogs portal
 List of dog breeds
 List of dog breeds from India

References

External links

Spitz breeds
Dog breeds originating in India